The Eric Shirley Shield is a rugby union tournament in the Kenyan domestic league. It was founded in 1962 as a second tier competition to the Nairobi District Championship 

For the 2016-2017 season, the league consists of twelve teams divided into two pools. Participating teams are reserve sides from clubs participating in the top tier Kenya Cup. There are sixteen rounds of pool games followed by a knockout competition to determine an overall winner.

Pool A 

 Kabras II
 KCB II
 Mean Machine II
 Mwamba II
 Nakuru II
 Western Bulls II

Pool B 

 Blak Blad II
 Homeboyz II
 Impala II
 Quins II
 Strathmore II
 Nondescripts II

Champions

There was a major upset in 1982 when Lenana School won the shield.

 2018 : KCB II 
 2017 : Impala II
 2016 : Impala II
 2015 : Impala II 
 2014 : KCB II
 2012 : Quins II 
 2011 : Homeboyz RFC
 2010 : Homeboyz RFC
 2009 : Quins II
 
 :
 1982: Lenana School
 :
 :
 :
 1977: Lenana School
 1967 Nondescripts

References

Rugby union competitions in Kenya
1962 establishments in Kenya